Glenroy John Gilbert (born August 31, 1967 in Trinidad & Tobago) is a Canadian former track and field athlete, winner of the gold medal in 4×100 metres relay at the 1996 Summer Olympics, and head coach of Athletics Canada.

Biography 
Born in Trinidad & Tobago, Glenroy Gilbert formed along with Robert Esmie, Bruny Surin and Donovan Bailey the best 4 × 100 m relay team in the mid-1990s.

He was a member of the Louisiana State University track and field team.

Gilbert made his major international championships debut at the 1988 Summer Olympics, where he was 21st in the Long Jump. At the 1990 Commonwealth Games, Gilbert was eighth in long jump, and reached the semifinal as a member of Canada's 4 × 100 m relay team at the 1992 Summer Olympics.

Gilbert won his first medal at the 1993 World Championships, when the Canadian 4 × 100 m relay team finished in third place. At the 1994 Commonwealth Games, Gilbert won the gold medal in 4 × 100 m relay and was fifth in 100 m. Gilbert also competed in bobsleigh at 1994 Winter Olympics, where he finished fifteenth in two-man bobsled and eleventh in four-man bobsled.

In 1995, Gilbert won a gold medal in 100 m at the Pan-American Games and was a member of gold medal winning Canadian 4 × 100 m relay team at the 1995 World Championships.

At the Atlanta Olympics, the Canadian relay team weren't the favourites, although they won almost all the titles available during the last couple of years. At the 4 × 100 m relay final, the Canadian team beat United States by almost half a second, to establish itself the best relay team in the world. Gilbert also reached the quarterfinals of the 100 m.

Gilbert and the Canadian team won a gold medal again at the 1997 World Championships and at the 1998 Goodwill Games, but again in absence of United States. At the 1999 World Championships the Canadian team were disqualified in semifinal and Gilbert ended his running career after the 2000 Summer Olympics, where the Canadians were eliminated in the semifinal.

After his retirement, Gilbert worked for a short time in CBC radio in Ottawa. He became coach for the Ottawa Lions Track & Field club, coaching sprints and relays. He has worked with Athletics Canada since 2006, primarily as coach of the Canadian men's and women's relay teams.

In July 2017 he was named Athletics Canada's permanent head coach; he had earlier been named head coach for the August 2017 world track and field championships.

Honors 
In 2008 he was inducted into Canada's Sports Hall of Fame as part of the 1996 Summer Olympics 4x100 relay team.

References

External links
 
 
 
 
 
 

1968 births
Living people
Canadian male sprinters
Canadian male long jumpers
Trinidad and Tobago emigrants to Canada
Track and field athletes from Ontario
Canadian track and field coaches
Olympic track and field athletes of Canada
Olympic gold medalists for Canada
Commonwealth Games medallists in athletics
Athletes (track and field) at the 1988 Summer Olympics
Athletes (track and field) at the 1992 Summer Olympics
Athletes (track and field) at the 1996 Summer Olympics
Athletes (track and field) at the 2000 Summer Olympics
Commonwealth Games gold medallists for Canada
Athletes (track and field) at the 1990 Commonwealth Games
Athletes (track and field) at the 1994 Commonwealth Games
Athletes (track and field) at the 1998 Commonwealth Games
Pan American Games gold medalists for Canada
Athletes (track and field) at the 1995 Pan American Games
Athletes (track and field) at the 1999 Pan American Games
World Athletics Championships medalists
World Athletics Championships athletes for Canada
Canadian male bobsledders
Olympic bobsledders of Canada
Bobsledders at the 1994 Winter Olympics
Black Canadian track and field athletes
Athletes from Ottawa
Sportspeople from Port of Spain
LSU Tigers track and field athletes
Medalists at the 1996 Summer Olympics
Olympic gold medalists in athletics (track and field)
Pan American Games medalists in athletics (track and field)
Universiade medalists in athletics (track and field)
Goodwill Games medalists in athletics
Universiade bronze medalists for Canada
World Athletics Championships winners
Medalists at the 1993 Summer Universiade
Competitors at the 1998 Goodwill Games
Medalists at the 1995 Pan American Games
Medalists at the 1999 Pan American Games
Medallists at the 1994 Commonwealth Games
Medallists at the 1998 Commonwealth Games